Wither is a 2011 young-adult dystopian novel written by Lauren DeStefano.  It was originally published on March 22, 2011, by Simon & Schuster Children's Publishing.  It is set in a future where scientists succeeded in engineering a perfect generation of humans, free of illness and disorders, but as a consequence, also created a virus that plagues that generation's children and their children's children, killing females at age 20 and males at age 25.  The fallout from this disaster drastically set apart the poor, who scavenge for food in a society that has few to no workers, from the rich, who celebrate each new building built as the continuance of the human race.  It is the first book of The Chemical Garden Trilogy.  The second book, Fever, was released in February 2012,.  The third and final book, Sever, was released in February 2013.

Plot 
Wither describes a future where genetic engineering has cured humanity of all diseases and defects.  People worldwide have foregone conceiving children naturally in favor of this new science.  This generation of perfect humans, later dubbed "The First Generation", lived very long and prosperous lives.  Unfortunately their children ended up plagued with a virus that killed all females by the age of 20 and all males by the age of 25.  Their children's children suffered the same fate.  Humanity now scrambles for a cure as society has broken down into large gaps between the rich and the poor.  Gatherers hunt for young girls on the streets to sell them into labs for research, and the unwanted ones go into prostitution or are simply killed. Others are occasionally sold to rich men to be their brides.

In Manhattan, 16-year-old Rhine Ellery is captured by the Gatherers and sold to Linden Ashby at his estate in Florida.  Rhine finds herself forced to marry Linden along with two other girls, Jenna and Cecily.  They join Rose as Linden's new brides, but the ailing Rose is already 20 years of age and does not have long left to live.

Life in the Ashby manor is very comfortable.  Cecily embraces it and Jenna endures it while Rhine constantly thinks of ways to escape.  She befriends her servant Gabriel and behaves like a good wife in front of Linden and his father, Housemaster Vaughn, in order to earn the title of "First Wife", which would grant her additional privileges to roam the mansion.  Rhine sets that as a goal in order to plan her escape.

By the novel's end, Rhine successfully escapes the mansion with Gabriel and begins a journey back to New York to find her twin brother, Rowan.

Main characters 
Rhine Ellery: A sixteen-year-old girl from Manhattan who was kidnapped to be Linden's wife.  She is the narrator and protagonist of the novel. She and her brother Rowan were orphaned at twelve due to an explosion at the lab their parents worked in. Both twins have heterochromia; one blue eye and one brown eye.
Linden Ashby: A twenty-one-year-old architect who marries Rhine, Jenna, and Cecily at the start of the novel.  He is also married to Rose. He had an older brother who died from the virus before Linden was born.
Jenna: The oldest of Linden's new wives at 18.  She dislikes living in the mansion as much as Rhine but is less adamant about trying to escape. She had two sisters who were also Gathered with her, but neither was chosen as Linden's brides and both were subsequently killed.
Cecily: The youngest of the sister wives at 13.  She is the most excited and interested about the marriage and enjoys her new life. She had been raised in an orphanage and much prefers the mansion. She often fantasizes about being a mother, and later bears a baby boy named Bowen. She is also very skilled in piano.
Rose: Linden's first wife, age 20, who is bedridden because of her age and failing health.  She is stressed by the medicines given to her and wishes for death.  She and Linden had been wed when Rose was eleven years old after the alleged death of her parents. Rose was once pregnant with Linden's child, a girl, but was told that the baby was stillborn.
Vaughn Ashby: Linden's father and Housemaster of the mansion where the novel takes place.  He seeks a cure for the virus, using whomever and whatever means necessary.
Gabriel: One of many servants in the mansion. He is eighteen years old. He was bought from an auction at an orphanage when he was nine.  He is assigned to care for Rhine and develops a relationship with her, and the pair eventually escapes together.
Rowan Ellery: Rhine's twin brother, who is seen only in flashbacks of their life together before Rhine was kidnapped.  Rhine believes he is still in New York, looking for her.
Deirdre: Rhine's "domestic" in the Ashby Mansion, who prepares Rhine's hair, makeup, and wardrobe; as well as serving as a personal assistant to Rhine. Deirdre is a young orphan, and her father was a skilled painter who taught her about art. She's also a very talented seamstress.
Bowen: Cecily's and Linden's son, named after Linden's deceased older brother, who is often seen crying and fussing.

Publication history 
Wither was first published as a hardcover in the United States on March 22, 2011, by Simon & Schuster Children's Publishing.  It has sold to several countries around the world.  It was published in the Italian language under the title Il Giardino Degli Eterni: Dolce Veleno on April 7, 2011. In the Netherlands it was published under the title Verwelken by Unieboek Het Spectrum.  It was published as Wither (translated as Layu) in Indonesia by Penerbit Kantera in June 2011.  It was published in the French language under the title Le Dernier Jardin Tome 1: Ephémère on August 19, 2011. It is available as an e-book from Simon & Schuster and other e-book carriers.  It is also available as an audiobook, produced by Recorded Books, LLC.

Critical reception 
Publishers Weekly gave Wither a starred review, calling DeStefano's debut novel "harrowing". B. Kunzel from VOYA calls Wither a "thought-provoking novel" that "will also stimulate discussion in science and ethics classes".  Kirkus Reviews recommends Wither "to fans of The Hunger Games trilogy or Ally Condie's Matched."  Booklist claims that "many [readers] will appreciate the intense character drama".  Carrie Ryan, author of The Forest of Hands and Teeth, says about Wither: "Lauren DeStefano crafts an all too believable future. I loved the world, the romance, the writing -- exactly the kind of book I've been craving to read."

Film adaptation
Universal Pictures acquired the film rights on October 23, 2013.

References

External links 
 thechemicalgardenbooks.com - Official website of the trilogy
 thechemicalgardentrilogy.com - Official fansite of the trilogy
 Wither at Simon & Schuster

2011 American novels
American science fiction novels
Dystopian novels
American young adult novels
Works set in country houses
Simon & Schuster books